The Van Buren First Assembly of God (VBFA), located in Van Buren, Arkansas, United States, is an Assemblies of God church in Arkansas. With a membership of over 1,000 and an average Sunday attendance of about 600, it is located in the Northwest part of the state. The church is more than 100 years old.

External links
VBFA online

Pentecostal churches in Arkansas
Assemblies of God churches
Churches in Crawford County, Arkansas
Buildings and structures in Van Buren, Arkansas